Paul Wells (February 12, 1930 – September 1, 2005) was an American sound engineer. He was nominated for two Academy Awards in the category Best Sound.

Selected filmography
 The Turning Point (1977)
 The Rose (1979)

References

External links

2005 deaths
American audio engineers
1930 births
20th-century American engineers